Krasno may refer to:

Krasno, Croatia, a village near Senj
Krasno, Russia, a village (selo) in Nizhny Novgorod Oblast, Russia
Krasno, Slovenia, a village in the municipality of Brda

See also
 Krasna (disambiguation)
 Krasne (disambiguation)
Krásno (disambiguation)